A  is a sumo wrestler's ring name. The tradition of ring names in sumo dates back to the Edo period, where they were used as a means to attract customers and hide the identities of the rikishi.

Like standard Japanese names, a shikona consists of a surname and a personal, or given name, and the full name is written surname first. However, the personal name is rarely used outside formal or ceremonial occasions. Thus, the former yokozuna  is usually referred to as simply Asashōryū. When addressing a sumo wrestler of the makuuchi or jūryō divisions, the suffix  is used instead of the usual . The given name is often, but not always, the wrestler's original name, and may be changed at the whim of the individual wrestler. Foreign wrestlers always adopt a new, Japanese given name.

Often, on first joining professional sumo, a wrestler's shikona is the same as his family name. As a wrestler rises through the ranks of sumo, he is expected to change his shikona. Stables often expect their wrestlers to adopt new shikona on entering the professional jūryō division. However, the timing depends on the naming traditions of individual stables. The wrestlers at Kokonoe stable for example, often adopt a new shikona upon entering the lower sandanme division, while wrestlers at Sadogatake stable generally adopt a new shikona on joining as trainees, even if those shikona are simply the character  attached to the beginning of their original family names.

Ring names vary widely, depending on the individual stable's tradition and somewhat less on the preferences of the wrestler. Wrestlers from the Oguruma stable traditionally adopt a shikona ending in the character , which derives from the name of the stable's founder, Kotokaze. Many wrestlers from the long established Dewanoumi stable adopt a shikona beginning with the characters , derived from the name of the stable. Wrestlers may choose shikona associated with their birthplace. For example, wrestlers from Hokkaido often use the first character of Hokkaidō,  in their shikona, producing names such as Hokutoumi and Kitanoumi.

Wrestlers that show promise may also take the shikona of a well-respected wrestler of the past to whom they have some sort of connection, such as being from the same stable or being a close relative. An historic example of wrestlers from the same stable are the two  yokozuna, while  is a time-honoured name at Dewanoumi stable. The Hawaiian Saleva'a Atisano'e was given the prestigious shikona of  when he joined Takasago stable. An example of a wrestler taking the shikona of a close relative is the former ōzeki , who adopted the Tochiazuma name from his father, former sekiwake . 

Wrestlers occasionally change their ring names in an effort to improve their luck, reinvigorate themselves, or for other personal reasons. For example , whose performance had been disappointing since promotion to ōzeki made a subtle change to the last character of his name, with  becoming , in a bid for better results.  was originally read as Kaikō when he adopted the name, but he later switched to Kaiō, which he felt was stronger-sounding. The low-ranker Hattorizakura, known for his extreme lack of success with just three career wins to 209 losses, changed his shikona in January 2021 to Shōnanzakura, a reference to the Shōnan region of Kanagawa Prefecture where he is from, but also using the kanji for "victory."

Foreign wrestlers usually take a shikona at the outset of their careers. American Henry Armstrong Miller wrestled under the shikona , which is also homophonous with St. Louis, his city of origin.

See also
Glossary of sumo terms

References

Sumo terminology
Pseudonyms